SS Edward Y. Townsend (official number 203449) was a  American Great Lakes freighter that served on the Great Lakes. She was primarily used to haul bulk cargoes such as iron ore, coal, grain and occasionally limestone.  She was in service from her launching in 1906 to her sinking in 1968. She is best known for sinking on the way to the scrapper, near , off the coast of Newfoundland.

History
Edward Y. Townsend was built in 1906 by the Superior Shipbuilding Company, of Superior, Wisconsin, for the Cambria Steamship Company of Cleveland, Ohio. She was the longest vessel at the time of her launch, therefore she was given the title 'Queen of the Lakes'. She began service in September 1906.

On April 26, 1909, Edward Y. Townsend collided with the steamer Philip Minch off Whitefish Point, Lake Superior sustaining minor damage. Low water levels on February 1 through February 6, 1926, caused Edward Y. Townsend to run aground near Buffalo, New York.

SS Daniel J. Morrell

Even though Edward Y. Townsend was built by a different shipbuilding company than  they were considered sister ships, because they were virtually identical. On November 29, 1966 Edward Y. Townsend suffered a crack in her hull  while traveling on Northern Lake Huron (in the same storm that sank Daniel J. Morrell). She was deemed unseaworthy, and laid up in Sault Ste. Marie, Michigan for two years.

Sinking
In 1968 she was sold to the Sea-Land Service Inc. for sale in the US Maritime Commission on vessels in the reserve fleet. She was later resold to a Spanish scrapyard. On September 15, 1968, Edward Y. Townsend passed down Port Colborne, Ontario in tow of the tugboats James Battle and Salvage Monarch. On October 1, 1968, she cleared Quebec with the steamer Dolomite, towed by the tug Hudson.

See also
 1940 Armistice Day Blizzard
 Great Lakes Storm of 1913
 Jones and Laughlin Steel Company 
 List of storms on the Great Lakes
 Mataafa Storm
 Largest shipwrecks on the Great Lakes
 List of shipwrecks on the Great Lakes

References

External links

 Six DEEP Shipwrecks of the Great Lakes
 Great Lakes Storm

Great Lakes freighters
1906 ships
Maritime incidents in 1909
Maritime incidents in 1926
Maritime incidents in 1966
Maritime incidents in 1968
Queen of the Lakes
Ships powered by a triple expansion steam engine
Ships built in Superior, Wisconsin